Oak Spring Farm is a historic farm located in Rockbridge County, Virginia, near the community of Steeles Tavern. The farm's oldest building, its I-house style farmhouse, was built in 1826 by William Moore. The name of the farm came from a nearby spring originally used by Native American hunters. In 1845, Uriah Fultz purchased the farm; he later gave it to his brother Isaac, who opened a blacksmith shop on the property. In 1860, a two-story horizontal plank addition was placed on the house. The farm's bank barn, added in 1878 is one of the largest in the United States; it replaced the previous barn, which had been destroyed in the Civil War.

The farm was added to the National Register of Historic Places on October 19, 1994.

See also
National Register of Historic Places listings in Rockbridge County, Virginia

References

National Register of Historic Places in Rockbridge County, Virginia
Federal architecture in Virginia
Buildings and structures completed in 1826
1826 establishments in Virginia
Farms on the National Register of Historic Places in Virginia